William Twysden may refer to:

Sir William Twysden, 1st Baronet (1566–1628), MP
Sir William Twysden, 3rd Baronet (1635–1697), MP